Music history of the United States includes many styles of folk, popular and classical music. Some of the best-known genres of American music are rhythm and blues, jazz, rock and roll, rock, soul, hip hop, pop, and country. The history began with the Native Americans, the first people to populate North America.  The music of these people was highly varied in form, and was mostly religious in purpose.

With the colonization of America from European countries like France, Spain, Scotland, England, Ireland, and Wales came Christian choirs, musical notation, broadsides, as well as West African slaves.  West African slaves played a variety of instruments, especially drums and string instruments similar to the banjo. The Spanish also played a similar instrument called the Bandora. Both of these cultures introduced polyrhythms and call-and-response style vocals.

As the United States incorporated more land, spreading west towards the Ocean, more immigrants began to arrive in the country, bringing with them their own instruments and styles.  During this time, the United States grew to incorporate the Cajun and Creole music of Louisiana, the Polynesian music of Hawaii and Tex-Mex and Tejano music.  Immigrants brought with them the Eastern European polka, Chinese and Japanese music, and Polish fiddling, Scottish and Irish music, Ashkenazi Jewish klezmer, and other styles of Indian, Russian, French, German, Italian, Arab and Latin music.

In the 21st century, American popular music achieved great international acclaim.  Even since the ragtime and minstrel songs of the 19th century, African Americans have greatly influenced American popular music.  The rural blues of poor black Southerners and the jazz of black urbanites were among the earliest styles of American popular music.  At the time, black performers typically did not perform their own material, instead using songs produced by the music publishing companies of Tin Pan Alley.  African American blues evolved during the early 20th century, later evolving to create genres like rhythm and blues.  During this time, jazz diversified into steadily more experimental fields.  By the end of the 1940s, jazz had grown into such varied fields as bebop and jazz.

Rock and roll was soon to become the most important component of American popular music, beginning with the rockabilly boom of the 1950s.  In the following decade, gospel evolved into secular soul.  Rock, country and soul, mixed with each other and occasionally other styles, spawned a legion of subgenres over the next few decades, ranging from heavy metal to punk and funk.  In the 1970s, urban African Americans in New York City began performing spoken lyrics over a beat provided by an emcee; this became known as hip hop music.  By the dawn of the 21st century, hip hop had become a part of most recorded American popular music, and by the 2010s had surpassed rock music in overall listenership.

American roots music

The first musicians anywhere in North America were Native Americans, who consist of hundreds of ethnic groups across the country, each with their own unique styles of folk music.  Of these cultures, many, and their musical traditions, are now extinct, though some remain relatively vibrant in a modern form, such as Hawaiian music.

By the 16th century, large-scale immigration of English, French and Spanish settlers brought new kinds of folk music.  This was followed by the importation of Africans as slaves, bringing their music with them.  The Africans were as culturally varied as the Native Americans, descended from hundreds of ethnic groups in West Africa.  American music is, like most of its hemispheric neighbors, a mixture of African, European and a little bit of native influences.  Still later in the country's history, ethnic and musical diversity grew as the United States grew into a melting pot of different peoples.  Immigration from China began in large numbers in the 19th century, most of them settling on the West Coast.  Later, Japanese, Indian, Scottish, Polish, Italian, Irish, Mexican, Swedish, Ukrainian and Armenian immigrants also arrived in large numbers.

The first song copyrighted under the new United States Constitution was The Kentucky Volunteer, composed by a recent immigrant from England, Raynor Taylor, one of the first notable composers active in the US, and printed by the most prolific and notable musical publisher of the country's first decade, Benjamin Carr.

African American music

In the 19th century, African-Americans were freed from slavery following the American Civil War.  Their music was a mixture of Scottish and African origin, like African American gospel displaying polyrhythm and other distinctly African traits.  Work songs and field hollers were popular, but it was spirituals which became a major foundation for music in the 20th century.

Spirituals (or Negro spirituals, as they were then known) were Christian songs, dominated by passionate and earthy vocals similar to the church music of Scotland, which were performed in an African-style and Scottish style call-and-response format using hymns derived from those sung in colonial New England choirs, which were based on Moravian, English and Dutch church music.  These hymns spread south through Appalachia in the late 18th century, where they were partnered with the music of the African slaves.  During the Great Awakening of religious fervor in the early 19th century, spirituals spread across the south.  Among some whites, slave music grew increasingly popular, especially after the American Civil War, when black and white soldiers worked together and Southern slaves fled north in huge numbers.

By the end of the 19th century, minstrel shows had spread across the country, and even to continental Europe.  In minstrel shows, performers imitated slaves in crude caricatures, singing and dancing to what was called "Negro music", though it had little in common with authentic African American folk styles.  An African American variety of dance music called the cakewalk also became popular, evolving into ragtime by the start of the 20th century.

Appalachian folk music

The Appalachian Mountains run along the East Coast of the United States.  The region has long been historically poor compared to much of the rest of the country; many of the rural Appalachian people travelled to cities for work, and were there labeled hillbillies, and their music became known as hillbilly music.  In the 19th and early 20th centuries, Irish and Scottish immigrants arrived in large numbers.  They mingled there with poor whites of other ethnic backgrounds, as well as many blacks.  The result was a diverse array of folk styles which have been collectively referred to as Appalachian folk music.  These styles included jug bands, honky tonk and bluegrass, and are the root of modern country music.

Appalachian folk music began its evolution towards pop-country in 1927, when Jimmie Rodgers and the Carter Family began recording in a historic session with Ralph Peer (Barraclough and Wolff, 537).  Rodgers sang often morbid lyrical themes that drew on the blues to create tales of the poor and unlucky (Collins, 11), while the Carters preferred more upbeat ballads with clear vocals, complementary instrumentation and wholesome lyrics (Garofalo, 53).  Their success paved the way for the development of popular country, and left its mark on the developing genre of rock and roll.

Other forms of American roots music
 

Though Appalachian and African American folk music became the basis for most of American popular music, the United States is home to a diverse assortment of ethnic groups.  In the early 20th century, many of these ethnic groups supported niche record industries and produced minor folk stars like Pawlo Humeniuk, the "King of the Ukrainian Fiddlers" (Kochan and Kytasty, 308).  Some of these ethnic musicians eventually became well known across the country, such as Frankie Yankovic, the Slovenian polka master.

This same period also saw the rise of Native American powwows around the start of the 20th century.  These were large-scale intertribal events featuring spiritual activity and musical performances, mostly group percussion based (Means, 594).

Large-scale immigration of Eastern European Jews and their klezmer music peaked in the first few decades of the 20th century.  People like Harry Kandel and Dave Tarras become stars within their niche, and made the United States the international center for klezmer (Broughton, 583).

In Texas, ethnic Mexicans who had lived in the area for centuries, played a distinct style of conjunto, different from that played in Mexico.  The influence of Czech polka music was a major distinguishing characteristic of this music, which gradually evolved into what is now known as norteño (Burr, 604).

The Cajuns and Creoles of Louisiana have long constituted a distinct minority with their own cultural identity.  The Cajuns are descendants of French-Canadians from the region of Acadia, the Creoles are black and French-speaking.  Their music was a mixture of bluesy work songs mixed with jazz and other influences, and included styles like la la and juré.  Though these genres were geographically limited, they were modernized and mixed with more mainstream styles, evolving into popular zydeco music by the middle of the century (Broughton and Kaliss, 558).

Beginnings of popular music

The first field of American music that could be viewed as popular, rather than classical or folk, was the singing of the colonial New England choirs, and travelling singing masters like William Billings.  It was here that techniques and traditions like shape note, lined-out hymnody and Sacred Harp were created, gradually spreading south and becoming an integral part of the Great Awakening.  The Great Awakening of the 1730s and ’40s was a period of religious fervor, among whites and blacks (both slave and free), that saw passionate, evangelical "Negro spirituals" grow in popularity (Ferris, 98).

During the 19th century, it was not spirituals that gained truly widespread acclaim, but rather peppy comic songs performed by minstrels in blackface, and written by legendary songwriters like Stephen Foster and Daniel Emmett.  During the Civil War, popular ballads were common, some used liberally by both the North and the South as patriotic songs.  Finally, late in the century, the African American cakewalk evolved into ragtime, which became a North American and European sensation, while mainstream America was enthralled by the brass band marches of John Philips Sousa.

Tin Pan Alley was the biggest source of popular music early in the 20th century (Garofolo, 17).  Tin Pan Alley was a place in New York City which published sheet music for dance songs like "After the Ball Is Over".  The first few decades of the 20th century also saw the rise of popular, comic musical theater, such as the vaudeville tradition and composers and writers like Oscar Hammerstein II, Jerome Kern and Ira Gershwin.  At the same time, jazz and blues, two distinct but related genres, began flourishing in cities like Memphis, Chicago and New Orleans and began to attract some mainstream audiences.

Blues and jazz were the foundation of what became American popular music.  The ability to sell recorded music through phonographs changed the music industry into one that relied on the charisma of star performers rather than songwriters.  There was increased pressure to record bigger hits, meaning that even minor trends and fads like Hawaiian steel guitar left a permanent influence (the steel guitar is still very common in country music).  Dominican merengue and Argentinian tango also left their mark, especially on jazz, which has long been a part of the music scene in Latin America.  During the 1920s, classic female blues singers like Mamie Smith became the first musical celebrities of national renown.  Gospel, blues and jazz were also diversifying during this period, with new subgenres evolving in different cities like Memphis, New York, New Orleans and Chicago.

Jazz quickly replaced the blues as American popular music, in the form of big band swing, a kind of dance music from the early 1930s.  Swing used large ensembles, and was not generally improvised, in contrast with the free-flowing form of other kinds of jazz.  With swing spreading across the nation, other genres continued to evolve towards popular traditions.  In Louisiana, Cajun and Creole music was adding influences from blues and generating some regional hit records, while Appalachian folk music was spawning jug bands, honky tonk bars and close harmony duets, which were to evolve into the pop-folk of the 1940s, bluegrass and country. The American Popular music reflects and defines American Society.

1940s and 1950s

In the 1940s, jazz evolved into an ever more experimental bebop scene. Country and folk music further developed as well, gaining newfound popularity and acclaim for hard-edged folk music.

The dawn of rock & roll

Starting in the 1920s, Boogie Woogie began to evolve into what would become rock and roll, with decided blues influences, from 1929's "Crazy About My Baby" with fundamental rock elements to 1938's "Roll 'Em Pete" by Big Joe Turner, which contained almost the complete formula. Teenagers from across the country began to identify with each other and launched numerous trends. Perhaps most importantly, the 1940s saw the rise of the youth culture. The first teen stars arose, beginning with the bobby soxer idol Frank Sinatra; this opened up new audiences for popular music, which had been primarily an adult phenomenon prior to the 1940s. In the 1940s, boogie woogie was using terms like "rocking" and "rolling" borrowed from gospel and blues music, as in "Good Rockin' Tonight" by Roy Brown. In the 1950s, rock and roll musicians began producing direct covers of boogie woogie and R&B stars, for example "Shake Rattle and Roll" by Big Joe Turner (covered by Bill Haley and his Comets in 1954) and "Hound Dog" by Big Mama Thornton (covered by Elvis Presley in 1956), and their own original works like Chuck Berry's "Maybellene" in 1955.

Roots of country music

The early 1940s saw the first major commercial success for Appalachian folk.  Singers like Pete Seeger emerged, in groups like the Almanac Singers and The Weavers.  Lyrically, these performers drew on early singer-songwriters like Woody Guthrie, and the whole scene became gradually associated with the political left (Garofolo, 196).  By the 1950s, the anti-Communism scare was in full swing, and some performers with a liberal or socialist bent were blacklisted from the music industry.

In the middle of the 1940s, Western swing reached its peak of popularity.  It was a mixture of diverse influences, including swing, blues, polka and popular cowboy songs, and included early stars like Bob Wills, who became among the best known musicians of the era.

With a honky tonk root, modern country music arose in the 1940s, mixing with R&B and the blues to form rockabilly.  Rockabilly's earliest stars were Elvis Presley and Bill Haley, who entertained to crowds of devoted teenage fans.  At the time, black audiences were listening to R&B, doo wop and gospel, but these styles were not perceived as appropriate for white listeners.  People like Haley and Presley were white, but sang in a black style.  This caused a great deal of cheeze controversy from concerned parents who felt that "race music", as it was then known, would corrupt their children.  Nevertheless, rockabilly's popularity continued to grow, paving the way for the earliest rock stars like Chuck Berry, Bo Diddley, Little Richard and Fats Domino.

Among country fans, rockabilly was not well-regarded.  Instead, the pop sounds of singers like Hank Williams and Patsy Cline became popular.  Williams had an unprecedented run of success, with more than ten chart-topping singles in two years (1950–1951), including well-remembered songs still performed today like "I'm So Lonesome I Could Cry" and "Cold, Cold Heart".  It was performers like Williams that established the city of Nashville, Tennessee as the center of the country music industry.  There, country and pop were mixed, resulting in what was known as the Nashville Sound.

Gospel and doo wop

The 1950s also saw the widespread popularization of gospel music, in the form of powerful singers like Mahalia Jackson.  Gospel first broke into international audiences in 1948, with the release of Jackson's "Move on Up a Little Higher", which was so popular it couldn't be shipped to record stores fast enough. As the music became more mainstream in the later part of the decade, performers began adding influences from R&B to make a more palatable and dance-able sound. Early in the next decade, the lyrics were secularized, resulting in soul music. Some of soul's biggest stars began performing in the 1950s gospel scene, including Sam Cooke, Dinah Washington, Dionne Warwick and Aretha Franklin.

Doo wop, a complex type of vocal music, also became popular during the 1950s, and left its mark on 1960s soul and R&B. The genre's exact origins are debatable, but it drew on groups like the Mills Brothers and The Ink Spots, who played a kind of R&B with smooth, alternating lead vocals. With the addition of gospel inflections, doo wop's polished sound and romantic ballads made it a major part of the 1950s music scene, beginning in 1951. The first popular groups were The Five Keys ("Glory Of Love") and The Flamingos ("Golden Teardrops"). Doo wop diversified considerably later in the decade, with groups like The Crows ("Gee"), creating a style of uptempo doo wop and the ballad style via The Penguins ("Earth Angel"), while singers like Frankie Lymon became sensations; Lymon became the first black teen idol in the country's history after the release of the Top 40 pop hit "Why Do Fools Fall in Love" (1956).

Latin music

Latin music imported from Cuba (chachachá, mambo, rumba) and Mexico (ranchera and mariachi) had brief periods of popularity during the 1950s.  The earliest popular Latin music in the United States came with rumba in the early 1930s, and was followed by calypso in the mid-40s, mambo in the late 1940s and early 1950s, chachachá and charanga in the mid-50s, bolero in the late 1950s and finally boogaloo in the mid-60s, while Latin music mixed with jazz during the same period, resulting in Latin jazz and the bossa nova fusion cool jazz.

The first Mexican-Texan pop star was Lydia Mendoza, who began recording in 1934.  It was not until the 1940s, however, that musica norteña became popularized by female duets like Carmen y Laura and Las Hermanas Mendoza, who had a string of regional hits.  The following decade saw the rise of Chelo Silva, known as the "Queen of the (Mexican) Bolero", who sang romantic pop songs.

The 1950s saw further innovation in the Mexican-Texan community, as electric guitars, drums and elements of rock and jazz were added to conjunto.  Valeria Longoria was the first major performer of conjunto, known for introducing Colombian cumbia and Mexican ranchera to conjunto bands.  Later, Tony de la Rosa modernized the conjunto big bands by adding electric guitars, amplified bajo sexto and a drum kit and slowing down the frenetic dance rhythms of the style.  In the mid-1950s, bandleader Isidro Lopez used accordion in his band, thus beginning the evolution of Tejano music.  The rock-influenced Little Joe was the first major star of this scene.

Cajun and Creole music

Louisiana's Cajun and Creole communities saw their local music become a brief mainstream fad during the 1950s.  This was largely due to the work of Clifton Chenier, who began recording for Speciality Records in 1955.  He took authentic Cajun and Creole music and added more elements of rock and roll: a rollicking beat, frenetic vocals and a dance-able rhythm; the result was a style called zydeco.  Chenier continued recording for more than thirty years, releasing over a hundred albums and paving the way for later stars like Boozoo Chavis and Buckwheat Zydeco.

1960s and 1970s

In the 1960s, music became heavily involved in the burgeoning youth counter culture, as well as various social and political causes.  The beginning of the decade saw the peak of doo wop's popularity, in about 1961, as well as the rise of surf, girl groups and the first soul singers.  Psychedelic and progressive rock arose during this period, along with the roots of what would later become funk, hip hop, salsa, electronic music, punk rock and heavy metal.  An American roots revival occurred simultaneously as a period of sexual liberation and racial conflict, leading to growth in the lyrical maturity and complexity of popular music as songwriters wrote about the changes the country was going through.

Early 1960s
The first few years of the 1960s saw major innovation in popular music.  Girl groups, surf and hot rod, and the Nashville Sound were popular, while an Appalachian folk and African American blues roots revival became dominant among a smaller portion of the listening audience.  An even larger population of young audiences in the United Kingdom listened to American blues.  By the middle of the decade, British blues and R&B bands like The Beatles, The Who and the Rolling Stones were topping the charts in what became known as the British Invasion, alongside newly secularized soul music and the mainstreaming of the Bakersfield Sound.  Folk-based singer-songwriters like Bob Dylan also added new innovations to popular music, expanding its possibilities, such as by making singles more than the standard three minutes in length.

Psychedelic rock

Psychedelic rock became the genre most closely intertwined with the youth culture.  It arose from the British Invasion of blues in the middle of the decade, when bands like The Beatles, Rolling Stones  The Yardbirds and The Who dominated the charts and only a few American bands, such as The Beach Boys and The Mamas & the Papas, could compete.  It became associated with hippies and the anti-war movement, civil rights, feminism and environmentalism, paralleling the similar rise of Afrocentric Black Power in soul and funk.  Events like Woodstock became defining symbols for the generation known as the Baby Boomers, who were born immediately following World War 2 and came of age in the mid to late 1960s.

Later in the decade, psychedelic rock and the youth culture splintered.  Punk rock, heavy metal, singer-songwriter and progressive rock appeared, and the connection between music and social activism largely disappeared from popular music.

Among the key venues that promoted psychedelic rock were the Matrix, the Avalon Ballroom, Fillmore Auditorium and the Berkeley Community Theater in San Francisco, The Family Dog Denver, the Grande Ballroom in Detroit, Whisky A-Go-Go and Kaleidoscope in Los Angeles, and Cafe Au Go Go in New York.

Soul and funk

From 1960s to 1970s, female soul singers like Aretha Franklin, and female pop singer Dionne Warwick and Diana Ross were popular, while innovative performers like James Brown invented a new style of soul called funk.  Influenced by psychedelic rock, which was on the charts at the time, funk was a very rhythmic, dance-able kind of soul.  Later in the decade and into the 1970s, funk too split into two strands.  Sly & the Family Stone made pop-funk palatable for the masses, while George Clinton and his P Funk collective pioneered a new, psychedelic funk. In 1970s Kool & the Gang and the Ohio Players were popular.  Album-oriented soul also appeared very late in the decade and into the next, with artists like Marvin Gaye, Al Green and Curtis Mayfield taking soul beyond the realm of the single into cohesive album-length artistic statements with a complex social conscience.

It was in this context, of album-oriented soul and funk, influenced by Black Power and the civil rights movement, that African Americans in Harlem invented hip hop music.

Country and folk

Merle Haggard led the rise of the Bakersfield Sound in the 1960s, when the perceived superficiality of the Nashville Sound led to a national wave that almost entirely switched country music's capital and sound within the space of a few years.  At the same time, bluegrass became a major influence on jam bands like Grateful Dead and also evolved into new, progressive genres like newgrass.  As part of the nationwide roots revival, Hawaiian slack-key guitar and Cajun swamp pop also saw mainstream success.

Tejano

With the widespread success of Tony de la Rosa's big band conjunto in the late 1950s, the style became more influenced by rock and pop.  Esteban Jordan's wild, improvised style of accordion became popular, paving the way for the further success of El Conjunto Bernal.  The Bernal brothers' band sold thousands of albums and used faster rhythms than before.

1970s
The early 1970s saw popular music being dominated by folk-based singer-songwriters like John Denver, Carole King and James Taylor, followed by the rise of heavy metal subgenres, glam, country rock and later, disco.  Philly soul and pop-funk was also popular, while world music fusions became more commonplace and a major klezmer revival occurred among the Jewish community.  Beginning in the early 1970s, hip hop arose in New York City, drawing on diverse influences from both white and black folk music, Jamaican toasting and the performance poetry of Gil Scott-Heron.

Heavy metal

Heavy metal's early pioneers included the British bands The Yardbirds  Led Zeppelin and Black Sabbath, though American cult bands Blue Cheer and The Velvet Underground also played a major role.  Their music was hard-edged and bluesy, with an often menacing tone that became more pronounced in later subgenres.  In the beginning of the 1970s, heavy metal-influenced glam rock arose, and musicians like David Bowie became famous for gender-bending costumes and themes.  Glam was followed by mainstream bombastic arena rock and light progressive rock bands becoming mainstream, with bands like Styx and Chicago launching popular careers that lasted most of the decade.  Glam metal, a glitzy form of Los Angeles metal, also found a niche audience but limited mainstream success.

Outlaw country

With the Bakersfield Sound the dominant influence, outlaw country singers like Willie Nelson and Waylon Jennings were the biggest country stars of the 1970s, alongside country rock bands like Lynyrd Skynyrd and Allman Brothers Band who were more oriented towards crossover audiences.  Later in the decade and into the next, these both mixed with other genres in the form of heartland rockers like Bruce Springsteen, while a honky tonk revival hit the country charts, led by Dwight Yoakam.

Hip hop

Hip hop was a cultural movement that began in Bronx in the early 1970s, consisting of four elements.  Two of them, rapping and DJing, make up hip hop music.  These two elements were imported from Jamaica by DJ Kool Herc.  At neighborhood block parties, DJs would spin popular records while the audience danced.  Soon, an MC arose to lead the proceedings, as the DJ began isolating and repeating the percussion breaks (the most popular, dance-able part).  MCs' introductions became more and more complex, drawing on numerous African-derived vocal traditions, and became the foundation of rapping.  By the end of the decade, hip hop had spread across the country, especially in Los Angeles and Chicago.

Salsa

Cuban and Puerto Ricans in New York invented salsa in the early 1970s, using multiple sources from Latin America in the pan-Latin melting pot of the city.  Puerto Rican plena and bomba and Cuban chachacha, son montuno and mambo were the biggest influences, alongside Jamaican, Mexican, Dominican, Trinidadian, Argentinian, Colombian and Brazilian sources.  Many of the earliest salsa musicians, like Tito Puente, had had a long career in various styles of Latin music.  Salsa grew very popular in the 1970s and into the next two decades, spreading south to Venezuela, Colombia, Puerto Rico, Mexico, Peru and especially Cuba.

Punk rock

Punk rock arose as a reaction against what had come before.  Early punks believed that hollow greed had destroyed American music, and hated the perceived bombasity and arrogance of the biggest bands of the 1970s. It arose in London and New York, with numerous regional centers by the end of the decade when acts like Ramones and Patti Smith saw unprecedented success for their defiantly anti-mainstream genre. It was the British band The Clash, however, that became wildly popular, more so in the UK than the U.S., and set the stage for adoption of elements of punk in popular music in the 1980s.

1980s and 1990s

The 1980s began with new wave dominating the charts, and continued through a new form of silky smooth soul, and ended with a popular glam metal trend dominating mainstream America.  Meanwhile, the first glimmer of punk rock's popularity began, and new alternative rock and hardcore found niche markets.  Hip hop diversified as a few artists gained mainstream success, finally breaking through in the last few months of the decade.

Hip hop

In the 1980s, hip hop saw its first taste of mainstream success with LL Cool J and Kurtis Blow.  Meanwhile, hip hop was continuing its spread from the East Coast to most major urban areas across the country, and abroad.  At the end of the decade, two albums broke the genre into the mainstream.  Public Enemy's It Takes a Nation of Millions to Hold Us Back and N.W.A's Straight Outta Compton broke through with highly controversial and sometimes violent lyrics.  N.W.A proved especially important, launching the career of Dr. Dre and the dominant West Coast rap sound of the next decade.  That same year (1989), De La Soul's 3 Feet High and Rising became the earliest release of alternative hip hop, and numerous regional styles of hip hop saw their first legitimization, including Chicago hip house, Los Angeles electroclash, Miami's bass, Washington, D.C.'s go-go and Detroit's ghettotech. Drawing inspiration from the rebellious attitudes of the Civil Rights Movement and groups like Public Enemy, many intelligent and politically minded rappers began what is known as underground hip-hop with artists like Boots Riley from The Coup leading the way.

1990s

As the 1990s began, hair metal was dominating the charts, especially formulaic bands like Extreme.  In reaction to that, the first few years saw a sea change in American popular music.  Nirvana's Nevermind along with Alice in Chains, Pearl Jam, and Soundgarden launched the defiantly anti-mainstream grunge movement  among mainstream audiences, while Dr. Dre's The Chronic brought his West Coast G Funk sound to widespread success.

Both these trends died out quickly, however, grunge done in by Kurt Cobain's death and disillusionisment with grunge, a form of alternative rock, becoming mainstream.  G Funk lasted a few years, displacing East Coast rap as the dominant sound of hip hop.  A rivalry began, fed by the music news, focusing on West Coast's Tupac Shakur and the East Coast's Notorious B.I.G.  By the middle of the decade, Tupac and Biggie were shot dead, and Dr. Dre's Death Row Records had fallen apart.  East Coast rappers like Puff Daddy, 50 Cent and Busta Rhymes re-established the East Coast, while Atlanta's OutKast and other performers found a mainstream audience.

Alanis Morissette, one of the top-selling artist of the 1990s, injected renewed popularity to singer-songwriters such as Tori Amos, Jewel, and Sarah McLachlan. In the wake of grunge and gangsta rap came a fusion of soul and hip hop, called neo soul, some popularity for British Britpop and the rise of bands like Sublime and No Doubt, playing a form of pop punk influenced by Jamaican ska and British two tone ska/punk fusionists from the early 1980s.  Techno also became popular, though nowhere's near as much so as in most of the rest of the world.

At the turn of the millennium, bubblegum pop groups like Backstreet Boys and Britney Spears were dominating the charts, many of them with a Latin beat (Shakira, Ricky Martin), and rappers like Jay-Z and Eminem were huge stars.  Some garage rock revivalists like The White Stripes and The Hives became highly hyped bands in the indie rock field, and achieved substantial mainstream success.  The first few years of the 2000s saw the further rise of pop-hip hop, fed by the breakthrough success of Eminem.  Indeed, hip hop became an essential element of nearly all popular music during this period, resulting in new fusions like nu metal.  Pop thug rappers like Ja Rule were nationally renowned, though hard-edged hip made a return within a few years with the rise of 50 Cent. Politically minded hip hop in the tradition of Public Enemy and Boogie Down Productions has also diversified since the early 1990s with groups like The Coup, Sweatshop Union, Mr. Lif, Paris, Immortal Technique and many others.

References

See also
 Music history of the United States in the 1950s
 Music history of the United States in the 1960s
 Music history of the United States in the 1970s
 Music history of the United States in the 1980s
 Music history of the United States in the 1990s
 Music history of the United States in the 2000s
 Music history of the United States in the 2010s
 Music history of the United States in the 2020s

 
History of the United States by topic